Špela Perše (born 4 August 1996) is a Slovenian swimmer. She competed in the women's marathon 10 kilometre event at the 2016 Summer Olympics.

In 2019, she competed in the women's 5 km and women's 10 km events at the World Aquatics Championships held in Gwangju, South Korea. In the 5 km event she finished in 16th place and in the 10 km event she finished in 27th place.

References

External links
 

1996 births
Living people
Slovenian female swimmers
Female long-distance swimmers
Olympic swimmers of Slovenia
Swimmers at the 2016 Summer Olympics
People from Bled